Jöns Bengtsson (Oxenstierna), in Latin known as Johannes Benedicti de Salista, (1417 – 15 December 1467) was a Swedish clergyman, canon law scholar and statesman, Archbishop of Uppsala (1448–1467). He was Regent of Sweden, under the Kalmar Union, in 1457, shared with Erik Axelsson (Tott), and alone 1465–1466.

Biography

Family 
Jöns Bengtsson was a member of the illustrious Oxenstierna family, various representatives of which had already become prominent in the public life of Sweden. His father was Privy Councillor Bengt Jönsson Oxenstierna, Lord of Salsta, and his mother was Kristina Kristiernsdotter Vasa, daughter of Lord High Justiciar Kristiern Nilsson Vasa.

Education and academic career 
He studied at the University of Leipzig and returned in 1438 to Sweden with a magister in artibus degree. On his return he was made Archpriest of the chapter of Uppsala Cathedral. Shortly afterwards his father was made Lawspeaker of the province of Uppland and Castellan of Ringstaholm Castle by the Privy Council. In 1440 he attended the Riksmöte in Arboga where the Danish King Christopher of Bavaria was elected King of Sweden, and took part in two Kalmar Union meetings in 1441 as a Swedish representative.

There are no Swedish sources mentioning Jöns Bengtsson in the period between 1442 and 1447, during which he likely returned to Germany to further his academic studies in canon law. He is mentioned as decretorum baccalaureus and Rector of the University of Leipzig for the summer term of 1445.

Archbishop 
Shortly after his father Bengt Jönsson and uncle Nils Jönsson Oxenstierna were named Co-regents, Jöns Bengtsson was elected archbishop in February 1448. He asked the Council of Basel for a confirmation of his election, and he had himself consecrated (30 June 1448) by his suffragans, the day after they had crowned Charles VIII as King. On 1 July, Bengtsson crowned the queen. The confirmation of his appointment by Pope Nicholas V did not reach him until the ensuing year.

In 1457, as Archbishop of Uppsala, he received from the pope the title of Primate of Sweden; the Archbishops of Lund, however, were permitted to retain their title of Primate of the Church of Sweden.

As Charles, to escape from money troubles, increased taxes and confiscated church property, dissatisfaction spread among clergy and people, and Bengtsson placed himself at the head of the opposition (1457). Entering Uppsala Cathedral, he laid aside his pontifical insignia, took up helmet, breastplate, and sword, and announced his intention not to resume his pontifical robes until Charles should be banished from the country. The King was forced to yield and went into exile in Danzig. Thereupon Christian I of Denmark was formally recognized King of Sweden, and crowned at Stockholm by Bengtsson.

General discontent soon followed, especially when Christian, on becoming heir to his uncle, Duke Adolph of Holstein, found himself in great financial straits. To meet his obligations, he levied enormous taxes, even in Sweden, without exempting ecclesiastics, religious foundations, or the moneys collected by papal mandate to defray the expenses of a crusade against the Turks. During a temporary absence of Christian I in Finland, the archbishop held the regency of Sweden; seeing the people in revolt against him and the heavy imposts, he took up their cause and suspended the collection of taxes. The king showed his displeasure by arresting the archbishop and sending him to Denmark. A revolution broke out afresh in Sweden, led by his cousin Kettil Karlsson Vasa, Bishop of Linköping, who defeated Christian I's army at the Battle of Haraker in 1464, becoming de facto regent. Charles VIII was recalled to the throne, and Christian I, to recover the country, became reconciled with his prisoner. Bengtsson went at once to Sweden, where he roused the people against Charles, whom he excommunicated. The archbishop succeeded finally in bringing about Charles' abdication, and the recognition of Christian I once more as King of Sweden. In reality, however, the archbishop held the effective reins of power and administered affairs as though he were the actual sovereign. He was unable to sustain this rôle. Discontented factions combined against him and, in 1466, elected Erik Axelsson Tott as regent, whereupon Bengtsson was compelled to retire. Dissensions continued, and the king of the Swedish party, Charles VIII, once more took the place of the king who represented the union of the three countries. The archbishop found an asylum with his friend Magnus Gren, on the island of Öland. Here he died at Borgholm on 15 December 1467, "poor and exiled, regretted by no one, hated by many, and feared by all".

Overview
The key to the political activity of Bengtsson is to be found in the ambition that was a part of his character — ambition for his family and his country. There was a strong antagonism between the great Oxenstierna family, to which the archbishop belonged, and the Bonde family, of which the king, supported by the national party, was member. Moreover, the archbishop was aware that the nobility and the leading men of Sweden, before the Union of Kalmar, had in general failed to respect the clergy and the property of the Church. In a union of Sweden with Denmark and Norway, he foresaw a limitation of the power of the Swedish nobles; in his character of archbishop, it was clear to him that such curtailment would be a safeguard to the temporalities of the Church.

References

External links

 Catholic Encyclopedia article

1417 births
1467 deaths
Rulers of Finland
Regents of Sweden
Jons Bengtsson
Roman Catholic archbishops of Uppsala
15th-century Roman Catholic archbishops in Sweden
Academic staff of Leipzig University
Leipzig University alumni